United Nations Security Council Resolution 203, adopted on May 14, 1965, in the face of growing instability, a developing civil war and the probability of foreign intervention in the Dominican Republic, the Council called for a strict cease-fire and invited the Secretary-General to send a representative to the Dominican Republic to report to the Council on the present situation.

The resolution was passed unanimously.

See also
Dominican Civil War
List of United Nations Security Council Resolutions 201 to 300 (1965–1971)
Operation Power Pack

References

Text of the Resolution at undocs.org

External links
 

 0203
1965 in the Dominican Republic
 0203
May 1965 events